Yukarıkartallı is a village in the Çayırlı District, Erzincan Province, Turkey. The village is populated by Kurds of the Arel tribe and had a population of 87 in 2021. The hamlet of Oğlaklı is attached to the village.

References 

Villages in Çayırlı District
Kurdish settlements in Erzincan Province